A Wonderful World may refer to:

 A Wonderful World (Tony Bennett & k.d. lang album)
 A Wonderful World (Susan Boyle album)

See also 
 Wonderful World (disambiguation)